Parabuccinum rauscherti is a species of sea snail, a marine gastropod mollusk in the family Buccinidae.

Description

Distribution

References

Buccinidae
Gastropods described in 2000